Harold Fraser (4 July 1915 – 3 July 1993) was a Guyanese cricketer. He played in six first-class matches for British Guiana in 1937/38 and 1938/39.

See also
 List of Guyanese representative cricketers

References

External links
 

1915 births
1993 deaths
Guyanese cricketers
Guyana cricketers